Peram Kuh (also Romanized as Perām Kūh; also known as Perm Kūh) is a village in Eshkevar-e Sofla Rural District, Rahimabad District, Rudsar County, Gilan Province, Iran. At the 2006 census, its population was 10, in 7 families.

References 

Populated places in Rudsar County